SLIT-ROBO Rho GTPase-activating protein 2 (srGAP2), also known as formin-binding protein 2 (FNBP2), is a mammalian protein that in humans is encoded by the SRGAP2 gene. It is involved in neuronal migration and differentiation and plays a critical role in synaptic development, brain mass and number of cortical neurons. Downregulation of srGAP2 inhibits cell–cell repulsion and enhances cell–cell contact duration.

SRGAP2 dimerizes through its F-BAR domain. SRGAP2C, a shortened version found in early hominins and humans that only has the F-BAR domain, antagonizes its action. It slows maturation of some neurons and increases neuronal spine density.

Evolution 
SRGAP2 is one of 23 genes that are known to be duplicated in humans but not other primates. SRGAP2 has been duplicated three times in the human genome in the past 3.4 million years: one duplication 3.4 million years ago (mya) called SRGAP2B, followed by two that copied SRGAP2B 2.4 mya into SRGAP2C and ~1 mya into SRGAP2D. All three duplications are also present in Denisovans and Neanderthals. They are shortened in the same manner, keeping the F-box domain but ditching the RhoGAP and SH3 domains. All humans possess SRGAP2C. SRGAP2C inhibits the function of the ancestral copy, SRGAP2A, by heterodimerization and allows faster migration of neurons by interfering with filopodia production as well as slowing the rate of synaptic maturation and increasing the density of synapses in the cerebral cortex. SRGAP2B is expressed at very low levels, and SRGAP2D is a pseudogene. Not all humans have SRGAP2B or SRGAP2D.

References

External links 
 GeneCards

Developmental genes and proteins
Genes on human chromosome 1